The men's K-1 1000 metres event was an individual kayaking event conducted as part of the Canoeing at the 2000 Summer Olympics program.

Medalists

Results

Heats
The top six finishers from each of the heats and the three fastest finisher advanced directly to the semifinals.

Overall Results Heats

Semifinals
The top three finishers from each of the semi-finals advanced to the final.

Overall Results Semi-Finals

Liwowski's disqualification was not disclosed in the official report.

Final

Holmann took the lead at 350 meters, then held off a late challenge from Merkov. The Bulgarian refused to attend the post-race press conference over media allegations he had failed a doping test in his home country.

References
2000 Summer Olympics Canoe sprint results. 
Sports-reference.com 2000 K-1 1000 m results.
Wallechinsky, David and Jaime Loucky (2008). "Canoeing: Men's Kayak Singles 1000 Meters". In The Complete Book of the Olympics: 2008 Edition. London: Aurum Press Limited. p. 473.

Men's K-1 1000
Men's events at the 2000 Summer Olympics